Bobki is a rural locality (a village) in Dobryansky District, Perm Krai, Russia. The population was 174 as of 2010. There are 27 streets.

Geography 
Bobki is located 46 km south of Dobryanka (the district's administrative centre) by road. Bobki (settlement) is the nearest rural locality.

References 

Rural localities in Dobryansky District